Polygonia interposita is a butterfly of the family Nymphalidae. It is found from Ghissar to the Altai Mountains, north-western China, the Himalayas and Mongolia. The habitat consists of gorges and slopes up to 2,500 meters above sea level.

Adults are on wing from March to October in two generations per year.

Subspecies
Polygonia interposita interposita (Ghissar-Darvaz, Pamirs-Alai, Tian-Shan, Saur, Tarbagatai, Dzhungarsky Alatau, Altai)
Polygonia interposita adya Churkin, 2003 (Mongolia)
Polygonia interposita tibetana Elwes, 1888  (north-western China)

References

Nymphalini
Butterflies described in 1881
Taxa named by Otto Staudinger
Butterflies of Asia